Thomas Frederick Cooper may refer to:
 Tommy Cooper (Thomas Frederick Cooper), comedian and magician
 Thomas Frederick Cooper (watchmaker)

See also
 Thomas Cooper (disambiguation)